Alfred Moore Gatlin (April 20, 1790 – February 23, 1841) was a Congressional Representative from North Carolina; born in Edenton, North Carolina, April 20, 1790; pursued classical studies at New Bern, North Carolina; graduated from the University of North Carolina at Chapel Hill, 1808; lawyer, private practice; elected as a Crawford Republican to the Eighteenth Congress (March 4, 1823 – March 3, 1825); unsuccessful candidate for reelection to the Nineteenth Congress in 1824; died on February 23, 1841, in Tallahassee, Florida; interment in St. John's Episcopal Cemetery, Tallahassee, Fla.

See also
Eighteenth United States Congress

External links 

1790 births
1841 deaths
Democratic-Republican Party members of the United States House of Representatives from North Carolina
19th-century American politicians
People from Edenton, North Carolina